The 2020 World Junior Figure Skating Championships were held in Tallinn, Estonia on March 2–8, 2020. Figure skaters competed for the title of junior world champion in men's singles, ladies' singles, pairs, and ice dance. The competition determined the entry quotas for each federation during the 2020–21 ISU Junior Grand Prix series and at the 2021 World Junior Championships.

Qualification

Age and minimum TES requirements
Skaters who reach the age of 13 before July 1, 2019, but have not turned 19 (singles and females of the other two disciplines) or 21 (male pair skaters and ice dancers) are eligible to compete at the junior level.

The ISU stipulates that the minimum scores must be achieved at an ISU-recognized junior international competition in the ongoing or preceding season, no later than 21 days before the first official practice day.

Number of entries per discipline 
Based on the results of the 2019 World Junior Championships, each ISU member nation can field one to three entries per discipline.

Entries
Member nations began announcing their selections in December 2019. The International Skating Union published a complete of entries on February 12, 2020.

Changes to preliminary entries

Medal summary

Medalists 
Medals awarded to the skaters who achieve the highest overall placements in each discipline:

Small medals awarded to the skaters who achieve the highest short program or rhythm dance placements in each discipline:

Medals awarded to the skaters who achieve the highest free skating or free dance placements in each discipline:

Medals by country 
Table of medals for overall placement:

Table of small medals for placement in the short/rhythm segment:

Table of small medals for placement in the free segment:

Records 

The following new ISU best scores were set during this competition:

Results

Men

Ladies

Pairs

Ice dance

References

External links 
 Official website

World Junior Figure Skating Championships
World Junior Figure Skating Championships, 2020
World Junior Figure Skating Championships, 2020
World Junior Figure Skating Championships, 2020
International figure skating competitions hosted by Estonia
Sports competitions in Tallinn
World Junior Figure Skating Championships, 2020